Crown Princess Hwi of the Andong Kim clan (Hangul: 휘빈 김씨, Hanja: 徽嬪 金氏; 1410 – 1429), also known as Deposed Consort Kim, was the first wife of Munjong of Joseon, but she was demoted to commoner and thrown out of the palace after using witchcraft to gain her husband's affection.

Biography
She was born into the Andong Kim clan, as the youngest child and daughter of Kim Oh-mun, a high-ranking official in charge of military affairs, whilst her grandfather was a magistrate at the Dongnyeongbu (Hangul: 돈녕부; Hanja: 敦寧府).

King Sejong selected Lady Kim as consort for his heir apparent, the future King Munjong, in 1427. After journeying from her home, she camped outside Hanseong and the Crown Prince was sent to greet her and escort her to the Eastern Palace.

In 1428, the Crown Princess requested to visit her natal home, to attend the burial rites for her grandfather.

Witchcraft
Court records indicate that in the winter of 1428 – 1429, Crown Princess Hwi asked her maid, Ho-cho (호초), how she could gain her husband's love. Ho-cho told her to cut her rivals' shoes into pieces and burn them to ash. She recommended that the consort test the method on two maids that she was already jealous of, Ho-dong (효동) and Deok-kim (덕김), which she promptly did. The Crown Princess then requested further methods and Ho-cho instructed her to drain the fluids from a snake, then rub those essences onto a cloth. Ho-cho claimed that if she wore that cloth in the presence of the Crown Prince, he would love her. Meanwhile, another maid, whom the consort had brought to the palace from her natal home, Sun-deok (순덕), discovered the remains of the burnt shoes in her mistress' perfume pouch. Sun-deok questioned Ho-cho as to how the Princess had learnt such things, but hid the shoes.

When the rumours of Crown Princess Hwi's activities reached King Sejong, he ordered that she be confined to her quarters, and her staff, including Sun-deok, were questioned. Ho-cho was sent to the Uigeumbu and Sun-deok told officials where to find the shoe remains. In shock, the King lamented his choice of such a daughter-in-law, ordered that her seal be retracted, her name removed from the ancestral temple and that she be demoted to commoner. The former consort was expelled from the palace so that she would not disgrace the royal family.

Aftermath
After Lady Kim was deposed, her father was also demoted and her brother was removed from his position in the Dongnyeongbu. Ho-cho was beheaded for instructing her mistress in witchcraft.

Several court officials also attempted to have other palace ladies, as well as Lady Kim's parents, interrogated to establish whether they had either been involved in teaching her or covered up her behaviour, but King Sejong denied all these requests.

Family
 Great-great-great-great-grandfather
 Kim Hwon (김훤, 金愃)
 Great-great-grandfather
 Kim Seung-taek (김승택, 金承澤)
 Great-grandfather
 Kim Myo (김묘, 金昴) (1324 - 12 June 1379)
 Great-grandmother
 Lady Min of the Yeoheung Min clan (정부인 여흥 민씨, 貞夫人 驪興 閔氏); daughter of Min Sa-pyeong (민사평) (1295 – 1359) and Lady Kim (1305 - 1374)
 Grandfather
 Kim Gu-deok (? – 1428) (김구덕, 金九德)
 Grandmother
 Lady Shin of the Yeongwol Shin clan (정부인 영월 신씨, 貞夫人 寧越 辛氏); daughter of Shin Gyeong-chang (신경창, 辛慶昌)
Father
 Kim Oh-mun (김오문, 金五文)
 Aunt – Royal Noble Consort Myeong of the (old) Andong Kim clan (명빈 김씨) (? – 1479)
 Mother
 Lady Jeong of the Cheongju Jeong clan (정부인 청주 정씨, 貞夫人 淸州 鄭氏)
 Sibling(s)
 Older brother –  Kim Jong-eom (김중엄, 金仲淹)
 Sister-in-law –  Lady Jo of the Pyeongyang Jo clan (? – 1450) (평양 조씨)
 Niece - Lady Kim of the Andong Kim clan (정부인 안동 김씨, 貞夫人 安東 金氏)
 Nephew-in-law - Han Chong-in (한충인, 韓忠仁) (1433 - 1504); Queen Insu’s older cousin (인수대비의 사촌 오빠)
 Grandniece - Han Eun-gwang, Internal Princess Consort Cheongwon of the Cheongju Han clan (한은광 청원부부인 청주 한씨, 韓銀光 淸原府夫人 淸州 韓氏) (1447 - ?); Shin Soo-geun’s second wife
 Grandnephew-in-law - Shin Su-geun (신수근, 愼守勤) (1450 - 1506)
 Great-Grandniece - Queen Dangyeong of the Geochang Shin clan (단경왕후 신씨) (7 February 1487 - 27 December 1557)
 Husband
 Yi Hyang, King Munjong of Joseon (조선 문종) (15 November 1414 – 1 June 1452) — No issue.
 Mother-in-law – Queen Soheon of the Cheongsong Shim clan (소헌왕후 심씨) (12 October 1395 – 19 April 1446)
 Father-in-law – Yi Do, King Sejong of Joseon (조선 세종) (7 May 1397 – 30 March 1450)

References

Notes

Works cited

15th-century Korean people
1410 births
Year of death unknown
Royal consorts of the Joseon dynasty
People convicted of witchcraft
1429 deaths
15th-century Korean women
Asian witchcraft